The 1984 West Virginia Mountaineers football team represented West Virginia University in the 1984 NCAA Division I-A football season. It was the Mountaineers' 92nd overall season and they competed as a Division I-A Independent. The team was led by head coach Don Nehlen, in his fifth year, and played their home games at Mountaineer Field in Morgantown, West Virginia. They finished the season with a record of eight wins and four losses (8–4 overall) and with a victory over TCU in the Bluebonnet Bowl.

Schedule

References

West Virginia
West Virginia Mountaineers football seasons
Bluebonnet Bowl champion seasons
West Virginia Mountaineers football